The Interstate Bridge (also Columbia River Interstate Bridge, I-5 Bridge, Portland-Vancouver Interstate Bridge, Vancouver-Portland Bridge) is a pair of nearly identical steel vertical-lift, Parker through-truss bridges that carry Interstate 5 traffic over the Columbia River between Vancouver, Washington and Portland, Oregon in the United States.

The bridge opened to traffic in 1917 as a single bridge carrying two-way traffic. A second, twin bridge opened in 1958 with each bridge carrying one-way traffic. The original 1917 structure is the northbound bridge. As of 2006, the bridge pair handles around 130,000 vehicles daily. It was added to the National Register of Historic Places in 1982, as the "Portland–Vancouver Highway Bridge".

Since 2005, proposals for replacing the bridge have been produced and debated. The bridge is considered responsible for traffic congestion of road vehicles and river traffic. Plans for a replacement bridge, known as the Columbia River Crossing (CRC) project, estimated to cost at least $3.4 billion, had come together by 2012 after many delays, but were very controversial, with both strong support and strong opposition. In late June 2013, the CRC project was canceled, after the Washington state legislature declined to authorize funding for the project. The Interstate Bridge Replacement Program, a joint effort between ODOT, WSDOT, Federal Highway Administration, Federal Transit Administration, Metro, Southwest Washington Regional Transportation Council, the cities of Portland and Vancouver, the Port of Portland, and the Port of Vancouver USA, was relaunched in 2017.

First bridge

Before a permanent crossing existed between Portland and Vancouver, there was an overcrowded ferry system operated by Pacific Railway, Light & Power Co.

Plans for the original bridge began as early as 1912, with local efforts leading to an initial survey and bond measures totaling $2,000,000; $1.5 million contributed from Portland, and $500,000 from Vancouver. Waddell & Harrington were retained as the project's consulting engineers. Construction on the bridge began in March 1915, and the structure opened on February 14, 1917 at a final cost of $1.75 million (equivalent to $ million in ), which was shared between Clark and Multnomah counties. Clark County paid $500,000 and Multnomah County paid $1.25 million—probably proportional to population.

Piers sit atop pile caps on wooden pilings approximately 70 feet deep. One of the  spans is the lift span for allowing river traffic under the bridge. The lift span is capable of moving  vertically, and provides  of clearance below when fully raised. The towers are
 tall, above the roadway.

It was the first automobile bridge across the river between Washington and Oregon, and the second to span the river at all, after the Wenatchee Bridge of 1908. In 1928 the states of Washington and Oregon jointly purchased the bridge from the counties and discontinued tolling the following year.

Electric streetcars operated across the bridge from opening day in 1917 until 1940. The bridge's deck carried dual gauge track, to accommodate both Vancouver's standard gauge cars and Portland's  gauge cars. Before the bridge, Portland had had a Vancouver streetcar line since 1893, but it ran to Hayden Island, where passengers transferred to a ferry owned by the street railway company to continue across the river to Vancouver. Streetcar service across the Interstate Bridge ended on September 3, 1940.

The bridge became part of then-new Interstate 5 in 1957. It was previously part of U.S. Route 99 when that route was established in 1926.

Upgrades

In 1958, a $14.5 million ($ million in  dollars) upgrade created a second, almost identical span and doubled the capacity of the bridge. The new bridge was built with a "humpback" that provides  of vertical clearance and minimizes bridge openings. Construction began in summer 1956, and the new, parallel bridge opened to traffic on July 1, 1958.

At the time the new bridge was opened, the old one was temporarily closed for rebuilding to give it a matching humpback section. When both bridges were first open concurrently, on January 8, 1960, each bridge became one-way (the new bridge for southbound traffic and the old one for northbound traffic) and tolls were reinstated at $0.20 for cars, $0.40 for light trucks, and $0.60 for heavy trucks and buses, until removed in 1966 after the construction expenses were paid off.

A $3 million ($ million in  dollars) upgrade to the lift cables, expansion joints, and a deck repaving was completed in 1990. The diesel generator used to power the lift was replaced in 1995 at a cost of $150,000. In 1999, the bridge was repainted at a cost of $17 million. A $10.8 million electrical upgrade was completed in mid-May 2005.

The vertical lift provides  of river clearance when fully opened. Openings last about ten minutes and occur between 20 and 30 times per month.

Outside peak commuting times (6:30 a.m. to 9 a.m. and from 2:30 p.m. to 6 p.m), marine traffic is granted right of way at the bridge by federal law (33 CFR 117.869).

In 2006, the six total lanes of the bridges carried 130,000 vehicles daily. Full traffic capacity occurs four hours every day.

The Interstate Bridge's name is a simple descriptive one based on its location, as a bridge connecting two states. In 1917, the new bridge gave its name to a Portland arterial street. Shortly before the bridge opened, a pair of streets through North Portland that were planned to be treated as the main route to and from the bridge, Maryland Avenue and Patton Avenue, were renamed Interstate Avenue.

Replacement planning

Columbia River Crossing (2005–2013)

The bridge is frequently a bottleneck which impacts both traffic on the freeway, as well as on the river. The Oregon and Washington transportation departments are jointly studying how to replace the bridge. Both spans have been rated as "functionally obsolete," with sufficiency ratings of 18.3% and 49.4% for the original and second spans, respectively. Initially, the estimated cost for a replacement bridge was around $2 billion, but that number has climbed steadily to around $3.4 billion. An independent study in 2010 estimated the full cost to be closer to $10 billion.

Design of a replacement (especially a fixed-span bridge) is complicated by the existence of a railroad drawbridge crossing the Columbia a short distance downriver (on the Burlington Northern Railroad Bridge 9.6), which constrains the location of the shipping channel; and by approach paths to Portland International Airport in Portland and to Pearson Field in Vancouver, which limit the height of any new structure. Some have proposed replacing the bridge in a different location. There were originally 12 transportation plans that were being studied to improve and expand the Interstate 5 crossing of the Columbia River. In late 2006, four of these plans were selected for a final proposal, along with a fifth no-build option. The Columbia River Crossing project's six local partner agencies selected a replacement I-5 bridge and light rail extension to Clark College as the project's Locally Preferred Alternative (LPA) in 2008.

There is also a longstanding debate as to whether or not a new bridge would include a MAX Light Rail line, express buses, or bus rapid transit. During his 2007 "State of the City" address, Vancouver mayor Royce Pollard stated 

In December 2007, Oregon governor Ted Kulongoski advocated for a new bridge, publicly endorsing the Oregon Business Plan's proposal.

In 2008, as fuel prices increased and project cost estimates soared, many in the area began questioning whether the project is worth the costs. In addition, many on the Portland side of the river fear that a 12-lane highway bridge to Vancouver, which many also believe has virtually no land use restrictions, will encourage suburban sprawl and development north of the river.

Further concerns over the 12-lane "Columbia River Crossing" (CRC) proposal include its failure to examine critical environmental impacts, such as damage to Clark County's drinking water supply, endangered fish habitat in the Columbia, and air pollution in North Portland.

In 2008, the Environmental Protection Agency found that the Draft Environmental Impact Statement for the CRC had failed to adequately cover these issues, as well as the potential induced demand for suburban sprawl. In a letter to CRC planners, the EPA wrote that "There was no indication (in the CRC environmental impact statement) of how these vulnerable populations might be impacted by air pollution, noise, diesel construction vehicles and increased traffic", referring to minority communities in North Portland.

In June 2013, the Washington Legislature voted against further funding of the CRC. On June 29, Oregon Governor Kitzhaber directed the CRC to shut down operations.

Interstate Bridge Replacement Program (2019–present)
The relaunched Interstate Bridge Replacement Program is a joint effort between ODOT, WSDOT, Federal Highway Administration, Federal Transit Administration, Metro, Southwest Washington Regional Transportation Council, the cities of Portland and Vancouver, the Port of Portland, and the Port of Vancouver USA.

The Joint Oregon-Washington Legislative Action Committee was formed by the Washington legislature in 2017 to study a bridge replacement, but initially had no Oregon representation for a year. The new committee was formed to prevent $140 million in federal funding allocated for the CRC from being recalled after a deadline, which was extended to 2025. In April 2019, the Washington legislature approved $17.5 million to establish a project office to conduct pre-design and planning work, which was followed by a matching contribution from the Oregon Transportation Commission in August.

A new timeline for the project, with the start of environmental review in 2020 and construction by 2025, was approved by the joint committee in late 2019. The replacement bridge's design is unspecified, with discussions about the inclusion of light rail, lane configurations, and investigating a third crossing all under consideration. Former Michigan Department of Transportation deputy director Greg Johnson was appointed as the bridge program administrator in June 2020. Several alternative ideas have been proposed, including an immersed tube tunnel, a third bridge, and a bascule bridge favored by the U.S. Coast Guard, but have been rejected for their drawbacks and cost.

, the project is estimated to cost $5.5 billion to $7.5 billion. The locally preferred alternative selected in 2022 is an eight-lane bridge with a light rail guideway on the west side and several modified interchanges.

See also

List of bridges documented by the Historic American Engineering Record in Washington (state)
List of bridges on the National Register of Historic Places in Oregon

References

External links

WSDOT:Interstate Bridge 
Columbia River Crossing: Home page of ODOT/WSDOT project to replace the Interstate Bridge

Bridges completed in 1917
Bridges completed in 1958
Bridges in Portland, Oregon
Bridges in Vancouver, Washington
Bridges over the Columbia River
Historic American Engineering Record in Washington (state)
Vertical lift bridges in the United States
Vertical lift bridges in Oregon
Movable bridges on the Interstate Highway System
Interstate 5
Road bridges on the National Register of Historic Places in Oregon
Road bridges on the National Register of Historic Places in Washington (state)
U.S. Route 99
Towers in Washington (state)
National Register of Historic Places in Portland, Oregon
1917 establishments in Oregon
1917 establishments in Washington (state)
Drawbridges on the National Register of Historic Places
Hayden Island, Portland, Oregon
North Portland, Oregon
Former toll bridges in Oregon
Former toll bridges in Washington (state)
National Register of Historic Places in Clark County, Washington
Steel bridges in the United States
Parker truss bridges in the United States
Interstate vehicle bridges in the United States